Bill Whitbourne (3 August 1902 – 24 September 1970) was  a former Australian rules footballer who played with Collingwood in the Victorian Football League (VFL).

Notes

External links 
		
Bill Whitbourne's profile at Collingwood Forever

1902 births
1970 deaths
Australian rules footballers from Victoria (Australia)
Collingwood Football Club players